Chacko Randaaman is a 2006 Indian Malayalam-language action film directed by Sunil Karyattukara, written by Biju Devassi, and produced by Saji Nanthyattu. It stars Kalabhavan Mani in a triple role along with Mohini and Jyotirmayi. in lead roles Music was scored by Sundar C. Babu with lyrics by Vayalar Sharath Chandra Varma.

Cast

References

External links
 

2000s Malayalam-language films
2006 action films
2006 films
Films scored by Sundar C. Babu
Indian action films